Kerman Lejarraga Arana (born 19 February 1992) is a Spanish professional boxer who held the European welterweight title from 2018 to 2019.

Professional career

Lejarraga vs. Charrat 
On 11 September, 2021, Lejarraga fought and defeated Dylan Charrat by technical decision in their 10 round contest. The scorecards read 96-94, 96-94, 95-95 in favor of Lejarraga.

Lejarraga vs. Flately 
In his next bout, Lejarraga beat Jack Flatley by knockout in the 9th round in his hometown at the Bilbao Arena in País Vasco.

Lejarraga vs. Metcalf 
In his next bout, Lejarraga fought James Metcalf. Lejarraga lost the bout via unanimous decision, 97-94, 96-94 and 95-95 in favour of Metcalf.

Professional boxing record

References

External links

Kerman Lejarraga - Profile, News Archive & Current Rankings at Box.Live

Spanish male boxers
Welterweight boxers
1992 births
Sportspeople from Bilbao
Living people